The 782d Troop Carrier Squadron is an inactive United States Air Force unit.  The squadron was first activated in 1943 as the 782d Bombardment Squadron.  After training in the United States, it served in combat in the Mediterranean Theater of Operations as a Consolidated B-24 Liberator unit in the strategic bombing campaign against Germany.  It earned two Distinguished Unit Citations for its actions.  After V-E Day, the squadron served in Air Transport Command, ferrying men from the combat theater back to the United States before inactivating.

The squadron was activated again in 1953, when it replaced a reserve squadron that had been mobilized for the Korean War.  It moved to France, where it provided theater airlift until inactivating in 1957.

History

World War II

The squadron was first activated at Alamogordo Army Air Field, New Mexico as the 782d Bombardment Squadron, one of the four original Consolidated B-24 Liberator heavy bomber squadrons of the 465th Bombardment Group.  After training under Second Air Force, the squadron deployed to the Mediterranean Theater of Operations in February 1944.

The squadron arrived in the Mediterranean Theater of Operations, where it was stationed at Pantanella Airfield, Italy in March 1944.  The air echelon halted in Tunisia for additional training before completing its move to Italy, where it became part of Fifteenth Air Force. It flew strategic bombardment combat missions over France, Germany, Italy, Austria and the Balkans, attacking targets such as marshalling yards, docks, aircraft factories and oil production facilities.  On 8 July 1944 the squadron attacked an oil refinery and marshalling yards near Vienna, Austria despite heavy flak and fighter opposition, earning the unit a Distinguished Unit Citation.  It was awarded a second citation for an attack on 3 August 1944 against a steel plant in Friedrichshafen, Germany.

The squadron was occasionally diverted from the strategic campaign.  It attacked troop concentrations in May 1944 to assist partisan forces in Yugoslavia and performed interdiction missions to support the advance on Rome.  Prior to Operation Dragoon, the invasion of southern France, it attacked bridges, railroads and gun emplacements near the landing area.  It supported Red Army and Romanian Army forces advancing in the Balkans in October 1944 and Allied forces in Northern Italy in April 1945.

The squadron moved to Waller Field, Trinidad and became part of Air Transport Command in June 1945. It used its Liberators as transports, flying personnel from Trinidad to Florida. The unit was inactivated in Trinidad during July 1945.

Airlift operations
In February 1953, Tactical Air Command activated the 465th Troop Carrier Group at Donaldson Air Force Base, South Carolina to replace the 433d Troop Carrier Group, a reserve unit that had been mobilized for the Korean War.  The squadron was redesignated the 782d Troop Carrier Squadron and assumed the personnel, mission and Fairchild C-119 Flying Boxcars of the 311th Troop Carrier Squadron, which was simultaneously inactivated.  In December, the 465th Group and its squadrons at Donaldson moved to Toul-Rosières Air Base, France, where it was joined by its parent 465th Troop Carrier Wing in April 1954.  The squadron participated in airlift operations, tests and exercises in Europe.

In March 1957, the 465th Wing reorganized under the dual deputy model.  The 465th Group was inactivated and the 782d was reassigned directly to the 465th Wing.  Four months later, the 465th Wing inactivated and transferred its operational squadrons to the 317th Troop Carrier Wing, which had moved to Évreux-Fauville Air Base from its former station at Neubiberg Air Base, Germany.  The squadron continued airlift operations in France until December, when it moved to Neubiberg, assuming the remaining theater airlift assets there until inactivating later that month.

Lineage
 Constituted as the 782d Bombardment Squadron, Heavy on 19 May 1943
 Activated on 1 August 1943
 Inactivated on 31 July 1945
 Redesignated the 782d Troop Carrier Squadron, Medium on 22 December 1952
 Activated on 1 February 1953
 Inactivated on 20 December 1957

Assignments
 465th Bombardment Group, 1 August 1943 – 31 July 1945
 465th Troop Carrier Group, 1 February 1953 (attached to 465th Troop Carrier Wing after 1 December 1956)
 465th Troop Carrier Wing, 12 March 1957
 317th Troop Carrier Wing, 8 July 1957 – 20 December 1957

Stations
 Alamogordo Army Air Field], New Mexico, 1 August 1943
 Kearns Army Air Base, Utah, c. 13 September 1943
 McCook Army Air Field, Nebraska, c. 5 October 1943 – 1 February 1944
 Pantanella Airfield, Italy, 25 April 1944 – June 1945
 Waller Field, Trinidad, c. 15 June – 31 July 1945
 Donaldson Air Force Base, South Carolina, 1 February 1953 – December 1953
 Neubiberg Air Base, Germany, 24 December 1953
 Toul-Rosières Air Base, France, 15 April 1954
 Évreux-Fauville Air Base, France, 24 May 1955
 Neubiberg Air Base, Germany, 5–20 December 1957

Aircraft
 B-24 Liberator, 1943–1945
 C-119 Flying Boxcar, 1953–1957
 Lockheed C-130A Hercules, 1957

Awards and campaigns

References

Notes
 Explanatory notes

 Citations

Bibliography

 
 
 

Troop carrier squadrons of the United States Air Force